Krishnadasi may refer to:
 Krishnadasi (2000 TV series), an Indian Tamil-language soap opera
 Krishnadasi (2016 TV series), an Indian television series